Catherine Françoise Lombard (8 October 1965 — 6 April 1994) was a French freestyle skier.

She won a gold medal in aerials at the FIS Freestyle World Ski Championships 1989 in Oberjoch. She also competed at the 1986 (8th place) and 1991 (5th place) world championships.

She took part at the 1988 Winter Olympics in Calgary, where aerials was a demonstration event. She finished then last, 8th.

World Cup results

Season standings

Competition victories

Podiums

References

External links 
 
 Catherine Lombard at GénéaFrance

1965 births
1994 deaths
French female freestyle skiers
Freestyle skiers at the 1988 Winter Olympics
Olympic freestyle skiers of France
20th-century French women